This is a list of lighthouses in Switzerland. Although Switzerland is a landlocked country, it has a number of lakes that are navigated by passenger ships and leisure boats.

Lighthouses

See also
 Lists of lighthouses and lightvessels

References

External links

 

Switzerland
Lighthouses
Lighthouses